Blind to the Beautiful is a single and EP from Fish's 10th solo album, A Feast of Consequences. It is Fish's first single to reach the Top 40 in the UK Independent Singles chart in over 20 years.
The lyrics address global warming. A video clip was made containing footage provided by Greenpeace.

Track listing

Single Release

EP Release

Charts

Weekly

References

2014 EPs
2014 singles
Songs written by Fish (singer)